Thomas Cave (born 16 November 1991) is a British rally driver. He is the son of club rally driver Peter Cave and his ambition is to become the next British champion in the FIA World Rally Championship. He is the UK's first minor international rally driver and achieved his international rally licence, issued in Latvia, at the age of 16.

Career

Early

Tom first began driving at the age of eight, when he took to the wheel of a car on private ground. However, it was when he was 13 that his father bought him a motorcycle-engined, rear wheel-drive buggy and it was this that would push his development forward at a huge rate.

He continued his development at the Martin Rowe Ice Driving School in Norway. Under the tutelage of the former FIA Production car World Rally Champion, Tom's car control skills and the beginnings of the additional experience, such as pace notes, began to take shape.

At the beginning of 2007, he teamed-up with former WRC co-driver Gemma Price and the pair headed to Latvia, where drivers can compete in genuine rallies from the age of just 14 years.

He spent 2007 competing in the Latvian RallySprint Championship at the wheel of an MG ZR. In 2008, he stepped up to a Group N Ford Fiesta ST, the same specification as used in the various one-make series around the world, including as a support series for the WRC.

He contested the Latvian Rally Championship that year but as the focus of his year was on his GCSE exams, was forced to miss several events. However, he secured his international rally licence and went on to make his WRC debut on the UK round of the WRC, Wales Rally GB at the end of the year.

Following further guidance and mentoring from Rowe, Tom and Gemma eventually won their class on the event, N3, by 15 minutes. In the run-up to the event, Tom was exposed to a flurry of media interest, as the event began just 18 days after his 17th birthday and he needed a full UK driving licence to compete.

As he returned home from the driving test, there were live TV news crews from Sky News, BBC News and ITV waiting for him. He also carried out live radio interviews with Radio 1,2,3,4 and 5 Live as he tore up his 'L’ plates. This meant that he would be the youngest-ever driver to compete in the UK round of the WRC.

This fact led to him being invited onto Channel Five’s motoring program, Fifth Gear. He was challenged to go head to head with presenter Vicki Butler-Henderson in a Subaru Impreza WRX around a Rallycross circuit to see who was faster. Tom beat the presenter, who also removed the car's rear bumper on camera.

2009

His program for 2009 was made up of selected events from the WRC, British Rally Championship and the Intercontinental Rally Challenge, since he was not able to contest a full championship in any, due to his age. As he was only 17, he was not permitted to drive legally in the majority of countries that formed the WRC and IRC.

However, he began his programme in Portugal on the WRC event, where engine failure on the first day when lying second in class cut his event short.

He then contested his first two asphalt events, beginning with the RDP Welsh International. He finished this fourth in class, a result he was pleased with considering it was his debut on the surface. He followed that up with sixth in class and third Fiesta on the famous Jim Clark Rally, a round of the British Rally Championship. He was chasing the first Fiesta spot during the event and looked to be taking the position before a small error cost him time and demoted him to third.

His next event saw a return to the WRC and Rally Poland, debuting in the WRC. He dominated the N3 class, including the international Fiesta one-make series on the first day but a head gasket failure on the second day meant that he eventually finished the rally sixth in class, 16 minutes behind the winner but with 25 minutes of 'SupeRally' penalties.

He was then invited to take part in the Richard Burns Memorial Rally by Neil Cole, presenter of the WRC on digital TV channel Dave. The pair finished 14th overall and sixth in class, another outstanding result considering they faced kit cars and ex-works Vauxhall Astras in their Group N Fiesta.

2010

Tom's 2010 season began with an outing on the infamous Rallye Monte Carlo, using the Ford Fiesta ST he had been driving in 2009. He eventually finished the event 27th overall and 8th in the IRC 2WD Cup, gaining his first international driver's championship point.

He also secured his first outright rally win, at the wheel of his Subaru Impreza N10 on the Coracle Stages in July and drove the MML Sports Group N Mitsubishi Lancer N4 on Rally Latvia but was forced to stop and change a puncture when lying second in Group N.

However, the most exciting news was when he secured the ex-Alister McRae Proton Satria Neo S2000 car for the season and would run as a semi-official car alongside the works team on selected events.

His first outing was on the Plains Rally in Wales where he finished second in N4 but in June, he took third overall on his tarmac debut, behind Patrik Snijers and Chris Atkinson. The following Ypres Rally didn't go so well, with all three Protons retiring on the same stage.

He contested several other events in the Proton and while setting impressive stage times, ultimately car failure would end each event.

2011

Tom began the year targeting the British Rally Championship with the JRM team running him in a Mitsubishi Lancer EvolutionX Group N car. He was second on the season opener, the Sunseeker Rally but an accident on the Bulldog followed by car failure on the Jim Clark meant that realistically, he was out of the running.

His focus switched to the BTRDA Series, which he had also been competing in using his Subaru and by the midpoint of the season, was leading the Production Cup class of the series.

A crash in the Subaru meant the car was out of action for the rest of the season so Tom was forced to hire a series of cars to complete the BTRDA but this didn't affect his performances. He went on to clinch the Production Cup championship with one round to go, so entered the Cambrian Rally in an MML Sports Mitsubishi Lancer World Rally Car and finished the event second on his WRC debut.

2012

Tom once again targeted the BRC in 2012, having decided to run his own Citroen DS3 R3 car. However, this was delivered too late for the first round the Sunseeker, so he used a rented Ford Fiesta R2 on that occasion.

He then won the Bulldog Rally, the second round, outright using a rented Citroen after his car was damaged on a test following component failure.

He was on top or close to the top of the BRC points table all season and despite another win on the final round, the International Rally of Yorkshire, was not able to overhaul double-BRC winner, Keith Cronin. He became runner-up in 2012 but won the Citroen Racing Junior Cup.

He was also selected by the Proton Motorsports factory team to represent it on two events: he won the Thailand Rally for Proton and on Wales Rally GB, the UK round of the FIA World Rally Championship, finished second in the S-WRC category, behind Craig Breen and ahead of Proton team-mate, PG Andersson.

Career results

Complete World Rally Championship results

 Season still in progress

SWRC results

WRC-2 results

Drive DMACK Cup results

IRC results

ERC results

References

External links

World Rally Championship
Crash.net
ewrc profile

British rally drivers
Welsh rally drivers
Living people
1991 births
Place of birth missing (living people)
World Rally Championship drivers